Coppet railway station is a railway station in the municipality of Coppet, in the Swiss canton of Vaud. It is an intermediate stop on the standard gauge Lausanne–Geneva line of Swiss Federal Railways.

Layout and connections 
Coppet has an island platform and a side platform which together serve three tracks.  (TPN) and Alsa Bustours Gex operate bus services from the station.

Services 
 the following services stop at Coppet:

References

External links 
 
 

Railway stations in the canton of Vaud
Swiss Federal Railways stations